Katharine Pearce may refer to:
Katharine Anne Pearce (born 1963), Welsh bowler
Katharine Georgina Pearce (born 1950), British botanist and ecologist